Nilton dos Santos Terroso (born 13 September 1979) is a former footballer who played as a midfielder, and is a coach.

Early life
Terroso was born in France and grew up in Prince George, British Columbia, Canada. He represented the latter nation at three age-group levels.

Playing career
Having moved to Portugal still in his formative years, Terroso never competed in higher than the Portuguese Second Division as a senior. He had two spells at S.C. Lourinhanense (Sporting CP's farm team, where he played alongside Simão Sabrosa), and also represented Clube Atlético Riachense.

Coaching career
In 2007, Terroso joined Cardiff City as youth team fitness coach. Two years later, he was appointed assistant manager of their under-18 side, and worked with them for two years. 

Starting in 2010, Terroso acted as fitness coach to the Welsh under-17s during one year. Subsequently, he joined Malky Mackay's staff at Cardiff City's first team in the English Championship, still being his assistant when the club promoted to the Premier League at the end of the 2012–13 season. 

In June 2014, Terroso was named head coach of Cardiff's under-21 team. At the end of the campaign, he left.

On 1 March 2016, 11 years after he last set foot in the country, Terroso returned to Portugal and was appointed at LigaPro club Atlético Clube de Portugal. After not being able to prevent relegation, he left.

Terroso signed as manager of S.C. Olhanense from the Campeonato de Portugal on 17 November 2017, succeeding Bruno Saraiva.

Personal life
Terroso is a qualified UEFA B licence coach, having completed a degree in football coaching and performance plus sports science.

References

External links

1979 births
Living people
French people of Portuguese descent
Canadian soccer players
Portuguese footballers
Association football midfielders
Segunda Divisão players
Canadian expatriate soccer players
Portuguese football managers
Liga Portugal 2 managers
Atlético Clube de Portugal managers
S.C. Olhanense managers
Portuguese expatriate football managers
Expatriate football managers in Wales
Cardiff City F.C. non-playing staff